KSC Maccabi Antwerp is a sportclub based in Antwerp, Belgium.

History of KSC Maccabi Antwerp.

1920 – Creation of Sport Club Maccabi

1930 – European Maccabi Games in Antwerp ( 1st time )

1956 – His Majesty the King authorises S.C. Maccabi to bear the title of "Koninklijke Sport Club Maccabi"

1962 – Inauguration of the Sport facilities in Hoboken

1964 – Inauguration of the Tennis Complex

1982 – Inauguration of the Tennis Hall

1983 – European Maccabi Games in Antwerp ( 2nd time )

1983 – Inauguration of the Squash Courts

1995 – Inauguration Maccabilaan for the 75th anniversary

2003 – European Maccabi Games in Antwerp ( 3rd time )

Chairmen :

1920 – 1st chairman: W. Swalf

1922 – 2nd chairman: G. Maringer

1925 – 3rd chairman: J. Proujansky

1944 – 4th chairman: J. Deutsch

1946 – 5th chairman: H. E. Bochner

1970 – 6th chairman: P. Goldfinger

1976 – 7th chairman: M. Grunberger

1982 – 8th chairman: A. Lilienthal

1984 – 9th chairman: R. Blits

1988 – 10th chairman: M. Sluszny

2000 – 11th chairman: S. Goldberg

See also
Football in Belgium
List of football clubs in Belgium

External links

Antwerp
Jewish football clubs
Football clubs in Belgium
Football clubs in Antwerp
Association football clubs established in 1920
1920 establishments in Belgium
Organisations based in Belgium with royal patronage
KSC Maccabi Antwerp